Paul Caiafa (born September 15, 1964), known professionally as Doyle Wolfgang von Frankenstein, is an American guitarist best known for his material with the horror punk band the Misfits and his own band eponymously named Doyle.

Education 
Raised in Lodi, New Jersey, he started attending Lodi High School two years following his brother Jerry's graduation. He played on the school's football team for all four years and graduated in 1982.

Career

1980–1983: Misfits (Glenn Danzig era) guitarist 

Doyle, the younger brother of the Misfits bassist, Jerry Only, was originally a roadie for the band and was taught how to play guitar by lead vocalist Glenn Danzig and Jerry. He joined the Misfits in October 1980 at the age of 16. Doyle was the band's third guitarist, replacing Bobby Steele after Steele failed to show up to a recording session. Jerry and Doyle financed the band by working at their father's machine shop.

Like Glenn and Jerry, Doyle incorporated the devilock into his image.

1987–1989: Kryst the Conqueror 

In 1987, four years after the dissolution of the Misfits, Doyle and Jerry formed the metal band Kryst The Conqueror with drummer The Murp. Select songs from the album were released by Jerry Only's record label "Cyclopian Music" as an EP, and featured guest guitarist Dave "The Snake" Sabo of the rock band Skid Row.

1995–2000: Misfits guitarist 
In 1995 Jerry Only settled a legal battle out of court with co-founder Glenn Danzig, effectively allowing him rights to the band's name on a performing level.

Doyle and Jerry reformed the Misfits in 1995, with Jerry acting as the band's figurehead and with Michale Graves as vocalist and Dr. Chud as drummer. The group released two full-length albums of new material.

2000s: Touring with Danzig and forming Gorgeous Frankenstein 

In 2005, Doyle left New Jersey for Las Vegas and began auditioning members for his own band, Gorgeous Frankenstein.

The same year, he appeared on stage with Danzig numerous times throughout Danzig's Blackest of the Black tour. They would meet again in 2007, when Gorgeous Frankenstein played their first tour, opening for Danzig. This line up included Argyle Goolsby of Blitzkid, Dr. Chud and Gorgeous George. Doyle has since joined them on several occasions to play 30-minute-long sets of classic Misfits songs.

During the latter quarter of 2011, former vocalist Danzig and guitarist Doyle performed Misfits songs on four occasions as part of the "Danzig Legacy" tour. The first of the four shows, which took place on October 7 in Chicago as one of the headlining acts at Riot Fest, saw a sold-out crowd of 5,000+. The last true "Legacy" show took place on Halloween at the Gibson Amphitheater in Los Angeles with an over sold crowd of 7,000+.

In 2012, "Danzig and Doyle" headlined several worldwide Festivals and did around 70+ shows together. Danzig would play his set before Doyle would join him onstage to perform a set of  Misfits songs.

2010s: Solo act 

The year 2013 saw the inception of Doyle's solo effort, eponymously named "Doyle". The band features Alex Story of Cancerslug on vocals, Dr. Chud of the second-era Misfits on drums, and "Left Hand" Graham on bass.

The debut album, Abominator, was released digitally through INgrooves/Fontana Distribution on July 30, 2013, through iTunes, Google Play, and other streaming services like Deezer. It was distributed by Altavoz (USA), Nippon Columbia (Japan) and Cargo Records (Europe).

The album was independently produced and released by Doyle's own Monsterman Records. The official CD release was in October 2013 in major retailers such as Best Buy and FYE. There is an "advance copy" that was sold at shows on the Danzig "Legacy Tour", as well as from Doyle's official website. This pre-released advance is lacking a 13th track, released on the final cut, entitled "Drawing Down The Moon".

In May 2014, Doyle announced he was teaming up with Alan Robert, bassist of Life of Agony, for a special Halloween 2014 issue of Robert's award-winning Killogy comic series. Robert said that this was a continuation of his original Killogy comic series but issue will surround Doyle's character. The issue will be published by IDW Publishing.

Doyle set out on the 2015 "Abominator Tour" in March, hitting the road as an opening act for Mushroomhead through April, with headlining dates continuing after into May. Dr. Chud left the band shortly before the band's first tour "Annihilate America" in 2014, and was replaced by Anthony "Tiny" Biuso midway through the 2015 tour. Shortly after, "Tiny" stated that he would no longer be playing with the band and would not continue on the remainder of the tour. A replacement was found immediately: Brandon Pertzborn, the latest tour drummer of Black Flag. "Left Hand" Graham was replaced for the 2015 tour and the band featured DieTrich Thrall on bass instead.

On May 12, 2016, it was announced that Glenn Danzig, Jerry Only, and Doyle would perform together as "The Original Misfits" for the first time in 33 years. They reunited for two headlining shows in September 2016 at the Riot Fest in Chicago and Denver.

Playing style and equipment 

Doyle's guitar playing style consists heavily of downstrokes and power chords. He admits to limited facility on guitar, believing "great songs" are more important than instrumental skill in achieving professional success.

Early on in Doyle's career, he used an Ibanez Iceman guitar. However, after experimenting with guitars in Kryst the Conqueror, Doyle developed his custom-made "Annihilator" guitar using his experience as a machinist to design and build the guitar himself. The bat shape was inspired by his love of Batman. These guitars have neck-through design with a graphite body and are loaded with a Seymour Duncan Invader pickup, and are strung with Dean Markley strings. The guitar was made without external screws on the body, as guitars with external screws scratched and cut his skin when he played shirtless.

In the 2000s, Doyle collaborated with October Guitars (now spelled "Oktober") to recreate the "Annihilator" with a signature pickup. Despite this, Doyle still uses his own Annihilator because Oktober were not able to make them the exact way that he wanted. In February 2022, he collaborated with Dean Guitars on a signature Annihilator guitar that will come loaded with his signature Sheptone pickup. The guitar more or less comes with the exact same specs as original but with custom fret markers that show music notes instead of the traditional white dots. It is priced at US$9,999

Since the mid-1990s he has used a Demeter TGP-3 rack preamp that feeds an Ampeg SVT bass head. His speaker cabinets are his own design, and have Celestion speakers. His pedalboard has a TC Electronic Chorus/Flanger, an MXR Micro Flanger, Digitech Whammy IV pedal, a Morley Bad Horsie 2 wah, an Ampeg Scrambler, a Vox Time Machine delay. In his amp rack, there is an ISP Decimator, and a Digitech Valve Distortion, Plus Line 6 G50 wireless systems.

Personal life 
Doyle married Stephanie Bellars in 2001. The couple have one daughter, Boriss, born August 17, 2002. He has three sons from previous relationships. The couple has since divorced, which was finalized in 2013.

Since 2013, Doyle has been in a domestic partnership with Alissa White-Gluz, vocalist of the Swedish melodic death metal band Arch Enemy. The couple are vegan.

Discography

Misfits 
 Walk Among Us (1982)
 Evilive (1982)
 Earth A.D./Wolfs Blood (1983)
 Static Age (1996)
 American Psycho (1997)
 Evillive II (1998) – live album
 Famous Monsters (1999)
 Cuts from the Crypt (2001) – compilation album

Kryst the Conqueror 
 Deliver Us from Evil (1989)

Gorgeous Frankenstein 
 Gorgeous Frankenstein (2007)

Doyle 
 Abominator (2013)
 Doyle II: As We Die (2017)

Video 
 You Must See It to Believe It (2010) (Gorgeous Frankenstein DVD)

References

External links 

 Official website

1964 births
Living people
Lead guitarists
American punk rock guitarists
Horror punk musicians
Misfits (band) members
People from Lodi, New Jersey
Lodi High School (New Jersey) alumni
Guitarists from New Jersey
American male guitarists
American male bass guitarists
20th-century American guitarists
American people of Italian descent
American heavy metal guitarists